Dandelions is the debut album by the British band King of the Slums, released in 1989 on the Midnight Music label.

Track listing 
All lyrics by Charley Keigher; all music by Charley Keigher and Sarah Curtis
 "Schooley"
 "Armed Robbery"
 "Unfit Mother"
 "Violate Nothing But the Best"
 "Up She Rises"
 "Barbarous Superiors"
 "Idolater"
 "Ardent Swains"
 "Up the Empire/Balls to the Bulldog Breed"
 "Psycho Motorbike Ride"
 "Bear With Me"

Personnel
King of the Slums
Charley Keigher - vocals
Gary Sparkes - guitar
James Cashan - bass
Sarah Curtis - electric violin
Stuart Owen - drums, tambourine

References

1989 debut albums
King of the Slums albums